Abdel Fattah Essawi (born 18 June 1924) was an Egyptian wrestler. He competed in the men's freestyle featherweight at the 1952 Summer Olympics.

References

External links
 

1924 births
Possibly living people
Egyptian male sport wrestlers
Olympic wrestlers of Egypt
Wrestlers at the 1952 Summer Olympics
Place of birth missing